United News of Bangladesh (UNB/) is a Bangladesh private sector news agency established in 1988. Enayetullah Khan established UNB in the 1980s. It is the first fully digitized private wire service in South Asia.

UNB has news exchange agreements with other major news agencies and networks, such as Associated Press, UNI, Xinhua, Kyodo, ANSA, Suomen Tietotoimisto and Rompress.

UNB is a member of international bodies such as Organization of Asian and Pacific News Agencies, Commonwealth Press Union, Asian Mass Communication Research and Information Centre and AsiaNet.

UNB says it has correspondents and reporters in every district of Bangladesh, and serves 20 million people daily.

Farid Hossain is the editor of UNB. He has previously served as the Bangladesh bureau chief of Associated Press. He also served as the Press Minister at the Bangladesh High Commission in New Delhi on a two-year contract.

Areas of work 
UNB provides comprehensive coverage of Bangladesh's news landscape, from politics to economics, development to disasters, and more. Additionally, their dedicated team is devoted to bringing exclusive coverage of cricket, the most beloved sport in Bangladesh and South Asia.

Recently, UNB assembled a team to provide comprehensive multimedia coverage of events occurring in Bangladesh.

References

External links
 

News agencies based in Bangladesh